A Wound Medal is a medal, usually military, generally given to persons wounded or otherwise invalided as a result of combat action, and may refer to:

 Wound Medal (Austria-Hungary)
 Wound Medal (Independent State of Croatia) (1941-1945)
 Wound Medal (India)
 Wound Medal (Vietnam), South Vietnam
 Desha Putra Sammanaya, Sri Lanka

Similar awards with other names
 Medal for the War Wounded, France
 Wound Badge, Germany, World War I and World War II
 Wound stripe#British Commonwealth, World War I and World War II
 Purple Heart, USA
 Wound stripe#Union of Soviet Socialist Republics, World War I and World War II

See also
 List of wound decorations